The Bloodstream EP is the debut EP by the English alternative dance band Stateless.

Track listing 

Stateless (band) albums
2005 debut EPs
Albums produced by Jim Abbiss
Albums recorded at Rockfield Studios